Gražutė Regional Park, established in 1992, covers 29,741 hectares in northeast Lithuania.

About 20% of its territory consists of lakes, including Lake Šventas and Lake Luodis, and wetlands; forests cover about 55% of the land. Several villages that include sites with architectural and historical value are located within the park.

References

  About Gražutė Regional Park. Official website.
 PROJECT ENVIRONMENT. European Commission.

Regional parks of Lithuania
Tourist attractions in Utena County
Protected areas established in 1992
1992 establishments in Lithuania